Storey Jackson (born April 8, 1998) is an American football linebacker for the Cleveland Browns of the National Football League. He played college football at Liberty.

Professional career

Dallas Cowboys
After not being selected in the 2022 NFL Draft, Jackson signed with the Dallas Cowboys as an undrafted free agent. On August 30, during final roster cuts, the Cowboys released Jackson.

Cleveland Browns
On December 13, Jackson signed with the Cleveland Browns practice squad. On January 7, 2023, the Browns elevated Jackson to the active roster. The next day he made his NFL debut playing fifteen snaps. He signed a reserve/future contract on January 9, 2023.

References

1998 births
Living people
American football linebackers
Liberty Flames football players
Dallas Cowboys players
Cleveland Browns players